The Lady Assassin is a 1983 Shaw Brothers film directed by Chin Ku Lu, starring Norman Chui, Leanne Liu, Tony Liu,  and Jason Pai Piao.

Plot
The villainous 4th Prince plots to change a royal edict proclaiming himself as heir to the throne instead of the Emperor's favoured fourteenth prince. The Fourth prince gets the backing of Han loyalists by promising that the Manchu rule of iron will soften when he is in power however he fails to keep his promise and turns against those that helped him.

Cast
Tony Liu as 4th Prince Yung Cheng
Norman Chui as Tsang Jing
Jason Pai Piao as Min Geng Yiu
Ku Feng as Lui Liu Liang
Leanne Liu (credited as Leanne Lau Suet-Wa) as Lui Si Niang
Max Mok Siu-Chung as 14th Prince
Ching Miao as Emperor Kang Hsi
Cheung King-Yu as Pearl
Yeung Jing-Jing as Jade
Yuen Tak as Pak Tai Koon
Kwan Fung as Lord Chang Tieh Yue
Johnny Wang Lung-Wei as Lord Loong Foh Do
Sun Chien as Kam Fung Chi

References

External links

The Lady Assassin on Hong Kong Movie DataBase
The Lady Assassin on Hong Kong Cinemagic

Kung fu films
Hong Kong martial arts films
Shaw Brothers Studio films
1980s Hong Kong films